The Dry is a 2020 Australian mystery drama thriller film directed by Robert Connolly, from a screenplay by Connolly and Harry Cripps, and is based on the 2016 book of the same name by Jane Harper. The film stars Eric Bana, Genevieve O'Reilly, Keir O'Donnell and John Polson.

The film had its premiere in Melbourne on 11 December 2020, before Roadshow Films released the film in Australia on 1 January 2021, and received positive reviews from critics. IFC Films released the film in the United States on 21 May 2021.

A sequel based on the Harper's 2017 follow-up book, Force of Nature, was later announced to be in production in 2022.

Plot
Federal Agent Aaron Falk returns to his hometown of Kiewarra in Victoria to attend the funeral of his childhood friend Luke Hadler, who has allegedly killed his wife Karen and their son Billy before taking his own life. Only their infant daughter, Charlotte, was spared. Luke's parents ask Falk to stay and investigate the crime, and he reluctantly agrees.

In flashbacks, it is revealed that Falk left town twenty years earlier to escape harassment when he was suspected in the death of his girlfriend Ellie. Upon his return, he finds many of the townspeople are still angry towards him, particularly Ellie's father Mal and her cousin Grant who brand him a liar and a murderer.

With the help of the town's local sergeant Greg Raco, Falk begins to look into the events surrounding Luke's death. They discover that the shotgun shells used in the crime were Remingtons, while Luke only owned Winchesters. Falk also interviews Scott Whitlam, the local school principal and Karen's boss, who explains that although she and Luke had some money trouble, they did not appear to have any serious problems. When Falk discovers the word 'GRANT?' handwritten on the back of a library book receipt, he suspects Grant wants to purchase the Hadler family farm since Luke's parents cannot manage it on their own.

Falk visits Gretchen, another childhood friend and Karen's co-worker who tells him there were applications found in Karen's desk for school funding. While reminiscing over an old photo album, Falk sees a photo of Luke holding Gretchen's newborn son Lachlan. He questions her about Luke being the father; Gretchen denies this, but indirectly confirms they were having an affair. Falk outrightly asks Gretchen if she is responsible for the murders, and she tells him to leave. The next morning, Falk steals some of the funding applications and realises Karen wrote 'GRANT?' in reference to finances. Aaron figures out that Whitlam has been embezzling from the school and murdered Karen and her family to cover up his crime.

Falk and Raco go to question Whitlam at the school, only to find he has fled to the bush with a jerry can of petrol and a lighter. As they search his house, they find the shotgun shells that match the shells used in the murder. When they catch up to him, Whitlam admits to his gambling addiction, stealing money from the school to pay his debts, and murdering the Hadler family to cover up his fraud. He then drenches himself in the petrol and sets himself on fire. Falk and Raco tackle him to the ground and put out the fire. Whitlam and Raco are badly burnt and hospitalised, although Falk's injuries are not as severe. The investigation is closed with Whitlam's confession, and Luke's parents thank Falk for proving Luke's innocence.

Before leaving town, Falk meets with Gretchen and apologises for accusing her; she forgives him. She reveals she was always in love with Luke but that he chose Karen. Falk visits the rocky area that he and Ellie used to frequently go to; he finds her old backpack, which contains a journal noting that she intended to run away because Mal was physically and sexually abusing her. He had also been similarly abusive of her mother which caused her to abandon the family. A flashback reveals that when Mal discovered she was leaving, he pursued her and drowned her in a rage. Falk says goodbye to Ellie, and then walks back into town with the backpack as evidence to clear his name along the riverbed, which is now completely dry.

Cast

Jane Harper, on whose novel the film is based, has a cameo as a funeral attendee.

Production
The film rights for the novel were optioned by producers Bruna Papandrea and Reese Witherspoon in 2015 and was produced by Papandrea's production company, Made Up Stories. Eric Bana starred in the lead role of Aaron Falk, with Genevieve O'Reilly as Gretchen and Keir O'Donnell as Raco.

Principal photography began in March 2019 in the Australian state of Victoria, including the Wimmera Mallee region.

Release
The film was due for release on 27 August 2020 but was delayed due to the COVID-19 pandemic. It had its premiere in Melbourne on 11 December 2020, and was released wide by Roadshow Films in Australia and New Zealand on 1 January 2021.

It was announced on 9 February 2021 that through Cornerstone Films, the film has entered into distribution deals with Leonine for German-speaking Europe, Swift for France, Notorious for Italy and Spain, Selmer Media for Scandinavia, Three Lines for Benelux, M2 Films for Eastern Europe, Terry Steiner International for  international airlines and ships, with UK negotiations ongoing at the time.

It was announced on 18 February 2021 that IFC Films acquired the film for distribution in North America, with a release in cinemas and on-demand on 21 May 2021. The film had its North American premiere at the SFFILM Festival on 10 April 2021, and was named one of the must-see films of the festival.

Reception

Critical response
The site's critics consensus reads: "A slow-burning crime drama anchored by a solid central performance from Eric Bana, The Dry offers gripping thrills for genre fans." On Metacritic, the film has a weighted average score of 69 out of 100, based on 23 critics, indicating "generally favorable reviews".

The Guardian gave a positive review, saying "The film remains rock solid throughout: taut, tough and tense, matching wide-open spaces with uncomfortably close drama."

Box office 
The Dry is among the top ten highest-grossing film of 2020 in Australia with A$20.1 million. The film made AU$3.5 million during its opening weekend in the Australian box office making it one of the highest grossing Australian film opening weekends ever, and the best debut for an Australian-made feature at the country’s box office from an independent studio. After five weeks, the film stood at more than A$19 million (US$14.6 million) and had overtaken Muriel's Wedding and The Water Diviner to rank 17th on Australia’s all-time top 20, just behind The Adventures of Priscilla, Queen of the Desert. By 23 March, the film had passed the A$20 million mark and was now the 14th-highest-grossing Australian film of all time, outpacing The Adventures of Priscilla, Queen of the Desert.

Accolades

References

External links
 
 

2020 films
2020 crime drama films
2020s mystery drama films
2020s police procedural films
Australian crime drama films
Australian crime thriller films
Australian mystery drama films
Australian mystery thriller films
Australian thriller drama films
Australian police films
Films about murder
Films about police officers
Films based on Australian novels
Films based on crime novels
Films postponed due to the COVID-19 pandemic
Films set in 1991
Films set in 2018
Films set in Victoria (Australia)
Films shot in Victoria (Australia)
Made Up Stories films
Police detective films
2020s English-language films
Films directed by Robert Connolly
Screen Australia films
Roadshow Entertainment films